Osyridicarpos is a monotypic genus of flowering plants belonging to the family Santalaceae. The only species is Osyridicarpos schimperianus.

Its native range is Eritrea to Southern Africa.

References

Santalaceae
Monotypic Santalales genera